The ETAP 28 is a Belgian sailboat that was designed by E. G. van de Stadt as a cruiser and first built in 1978.

Production
The design was built by ETAP Yachting in Belgium between 1978 and 1987, with 375 boats completed, but it is now out of production.

Design
The ETAP 28 is a recreational keelboat, built predominantly of glassfibre. It has a masthead sloop rig, a raked stem, a plumb transom, an internally mounted spade-type rudder controlled by a tiller and a fixed fin keel. It displaces  and carries  of ballast.

For sailing downwind the design may be equipped with a spinnaker.

Operational history
The boat was at one time supported by a class club, the ETAP Owners Association.

See also
List of sailing boat types

References

Keelboats
1980s sailboat type designs
Sailing yachts
Sailboat type designs by E. G. van de Stadt
Sailboat types built by ETAP Yachting